Capsella gracilis is a sterile plant that were generated from a hybridization between C. bursa-pastoris and C. rubella.

References

gracilis
Plant nothospecies